The Lost Hours  is a 1952 British film noir directed by David MacDonald and starring Mark Stevens, Jean Kent and John Bentley. It was produced by Tempean Films which specialised in making second features at the time, and marked Kent's first descent into B films after her 1940s stardom. It was shot at Isleworth Studios and on location around London. The film's sets were designed by the art director Andrew Mazzei. It was released in the United States the following year by RKO Pictures as The Big Frame.

Plot summary
An American returns for a reunion in the United Kingdom, where he served as a pilot during the Second World War, but finds himself framed for a murder he didn't commit.

Cast
 Mark Stevens as Paul Smith
 Jean Kent as Louise Parker
 John Bentley as Clark Sutton
 Garry Marsh as Inspector Foster
 Cyril Smith as Detective Sergeant Roper
 Dianne Foster as Dianne Wrigley
 Bryan Coleman as Tom Wrigley
 Leslie Perrins as Dr Derek Morrison
 Duncan Lamont as Bristow
 John Horsley as Brown
 Jack Lambert as John Parker
 John Harvey as Kenneth Peters
 Sam Kydd as Fred, mechanic at Bristow & Brown
 Thora Hird as Hotel Maid
 John Gabriel as Barman
 Alastair Hunter as Commissionaire
 Hal Osmond as Garage attendant
 Ballard Berkeley in a minor role
Peter Hawkins as Mechanic (uncredited)

References

Bibliography
 Chibnall, Steve & McFarlane, Brian. The British 'B' Film. Palgrave MacMillan, 2009.

External links
 
 

1952 films
1952 crime drama films
British black-and-white films
British crime drama films
Film noir
Films directed by David MacDonald (director)
Films set in London
Films shot in London
Films shot at Isleworth Studios
1950s English-language films
1950s British films